Zhang Wei (born 22 March 1994) is a Chinese male track and field athlete who competes in the pole vault. He was a silver medallist at the Asian Indoor Athletics Championships in 2012 and won the regional title at the 2015 Asian Athletics Championships.

Career
Zhang was born in the province of Shandong on the east Coast of China. He first came to prominence nationally with a win at the Chinese youth championships in 2010. He proceeded to win the Chinese junior championships and the China City Games title the following year. A best of  came as part of a fourth-place finish at the Chinese Athletics Championships. He competed abroad for the first time in 2012 and managed a new best of  indoors in Villeurbanne. This served a preparation for the 2012 Asian Indoor Athletics Championships, where the 17-year-old was runner-up behind his older compatriot (and national record holder) Yang Yansheng. Another indoor best of  followed at the Chinese Taipei vs. China international match a month later.

In the 2012 outdoor season, he defended his Chinese junior title. A debut on the IAAF Diamond League circuit came shortly after and he managed to finish seventh at the Shanghai Golden Grand Prix meet. He became the continental champion at the 2012 Asian Junior Athletics Championships with a championship record height. In spite of this success, he failed to register a valid mark at the 2012 World Junior Championships in Athletics. At the end of the season, he equalled his best to place third at the Chinese Championships, behind Yang and Xue Changrui.

He won the national junior title for a third time running, but failed to record a height at the 2013 World Championships in Athletics – his senior global debut. He dropped down the national rankings at the 12th Chinese Games, taking sixth place.

Zhang maintained his form into the following season and built upon his 2012 junior regional title with a senior gold medal at the 2015 Asian Athletics Championships in Wuhan, matching his best to see off a challenge from Japan's Seito Yamamoto.

Personal bests
Pole vault outdoor:  (2015)
Pole vault indoor:  (2014)

National titles
Chinese Athletics Championships
Pole vault: 2014

International competitions

References

External links

Living people
1994 births
Athletes from Shandong
Chinese male pole vaulters
World Athletics Championships athletes for China